The Spitfire Collection is a compilation album released in 2007 by Spitfire Records. The release consists of tracks from the Spitfire-era Testament titles Live at the Fillmore (actually re-released by Spitfire), Demonic (also a re-release by Spitfire), The Gathering, First Strike Still Deadly, and Live in London. 

Of note is the number of musicians present on this compilation; there are five different drummers (Louie Clemente, Jon Dette, Gene Hoglan, Dave Lombardo, John Tempesta), three different bassists (Greg Christian, Steve DiGiorgio, Derrick Ramirez), and four different guitarists (Glen Alvelais, James Murphy, Eric Peterson, Alex Skolnick), though Peterson appears on all tracks. 

Chuck Billy provides vocals on all tracks, but there is one guest vocalist:  Steve Souza, who sang the last two tracks on the First Strike Still Deadly release.

Track listing
The New Order (Live)
Souls of Black (Live)
Practice What You Preach (Live)
Hatreds Rise
The Burning Times
John Doe
Careful What You Wish For
Down for Life
Riding the Snake
Over the Wall
The Preacher
Into the Pit
Trial by Fire (Live)
Disciples of the Watch (Live)

References 

2007 compilation albums
Testament (band) compilation albums
Spitfire Records compilation albums
Thrash metal compilation albums